The Panglong Agreement was reached in Panglong, Southern Shan State, between the Burmese government under Aung San and the Shan, Kachin, and Chin peoples on 12 February 1947. The agreement accepted "full autonomy in internal administration for the Frontier Areas" in principle and envisioned the creation of a Kachin State by the Constituent Assembly. It continued the financial relations established between the Shan states and the Burmese federal government, and envisioned similar arrangements for the Kachin Hills and the Chin Hills. The anniversary of this agreement is celebrated annually as Union Day.

Signatories
Aung Zan Wai, Pe Khin, Bo Hmu Aung, Sir Maung Gyi, Dr. Sein Mya Maung, Myoma U Than Kywe were among the negotiators of the historical Panglong Conference negotiated with Bamar leader General Aung San and other ethnic leaders in 1947.

In popular culture 
In 1973, Sai Kham Leik composed the Shan language song, "Lik Hom Mai Panglong", for Sai Hsai Mao, and remains a pop classic.

See also

 Panglong Conference
 Chin State
 Kachin State

References

External links

 
 Text of the Panglong Agreement
 Ethnic Peace Plan 2014
Celebration of Panglong Agreement Day

History of Myanmar
Treaties of Myanmar
1947 in Burma
1947 documents